Carmelo Miranda (born 20 December 1969) is a Spanish former professional racing cyclist. He rode in two editions of the Tour de France.

References

External links
 

1969 births
Living people
Spanish male cyclists
Sportspeople from the Province of Burgos
Cyclists from Castile and León